Sygma may refer to:
 SYGMA Network, Inc., a wholly owned subsidiary of Sysco Corporation
 Sygma, or Sygma Photo News, a photography agency that was purchased by Corbis and closed in 2010

See also
 Sigma (disambiguation)